Trice Islands is a group of small ice-covered islands lying just west of Evans Point, Thurston Island, in Peacock Sound. The group rises above the general level of Abbot Ice Shelf which occupies the sound. First mapped from air photos taken by U.S. Navy Operation Highjump, 1946–47. Named by Advisory Committee on Antarctic Names (US-ACAN) for Jack L. Trice, meteorologist at Byrd Station, 1964–65.

Maps
 Thurston Island – Jones Mountains. 1:500000 Antarctica Sketch Map. US Geological Survey, 1967.
 Antarctic Digital Database (ADD). Scale 1:250000 topographic map of Antarctica. Scientific Committee on Antarctic Research (SCAR). Since 1993, regularly upgraded and updated.

See also 
 List of Antarctic and sub-Antarctic islands

Islands of Ellsworth Land